Olga Germanova (born September 26, 1961, Peny, Belovsky District, Kursk Oblast) is a Russian political figure and a deputy of the 7th and 8th State Dumas. 

From 1992 to 1999, she worked in the administration of the Kursk Oblast. In 1999-2009 she was Deputy Chairman of the Committee for Youth Affairs and Tourism of the Kursk Region. In 2009 she was appointed Deputy head of administration of Kursk. Simultaneously, she headed the youth headquarters of the Kursk regional branch of "United Russia". On October 14, 2012, she was elected deputy of the Kursk City Council of the 5th convocation. On November 8, 2012, Germanova was appointed the head of the Kursk City Administration. She left the post in 2016 as she was elected deputy of the 7th State Duma; she ran with the United Russia. In 2021, Germanova was re-elected for the 8th State Duma.

References

1961 births
Living people
United Russia politicians
21st-century Russian politicians
Seventh convocation members of the State Duma (Russian Federation)
Eighth convocation members of the State Duma (Russian Federation)